"Human" is a song by American rock band the Killers. Written by and produced by the band members and co-produced by Stuart Price, it was released as the first single from their third studio album Day & Age (2008).

"Human" has received generally positive feedback from music critics, praising the composition, the musical influences and the production. It became the third song by the band to enter the top 5 of the UK Singles Chart. It was their first top-10 hit in the Netherlands (peaking at number 2). The song was released on a seven-inch picture disc throughout the world on various dates in November 2008, with a B-side entitled "A Crippling Blow".

Background 
In an interview with Rolling Stone magazine's Smoking Section, Brandon Flowers described "Human" as "Johnny Cash meets the Pet Shop Boys". Flowers stated that the song was created with Stuart Price during their work with him on the Sawdust album, and has changed very little since then. He confessed to not putting it on Sawdust as "it was too good".

The cover art for the single is a portrait of the band's guitarist Dave Keuning, and is one of the four portraits drawn by Paul Normansell for the album.

The earliest digital release of the song was missing a hi-hat section at the beginning of the song.

Reception 
The song received positive reviews from contemporary critics. An interview in The Observer newspaper stated that the track "is a cross between New Order and Bruce Springsteen - that should please fans of 'Mr. Brightside'." Chris Williams of Billboard gave a positive review, echoing The Observer'''s description of "merging a Boss-like melody over a New Order-injected rave-up." He also praised the song for "stretching the soundscape of alternative rock, which has increasingly become difficult to differentiate between mainstream rock." Music Radar complimented the song in their review of Day & Age, saying "A gentle, phased, clicky guitar riff opens this gorgeous nod to the gentle side of '80s new wave." Caryn Ganz with Rolling Stone gave the tune three-and-a-half stars, calling it "delicious." "Human" was voted the Best Song of 2008 by the readers of Rolling Stone.

In 2010, a vote by listeners to UK radio station XFM polled the song at #97 in its poll of the Top 1,000 Songs of All Time. In December 2009, it was voted the 25th Best Song of the Decade by listeners of UK music station Absolute Radio. In October 2011, NME placed it at number 144 on its list "150 Best Tracks of the Past 15 Years". Paste and American Songwriter both ranked the song number four on their lists of the greatest Killers songs.

In 2008, the song was the Top Globally Streamed Song on Spotify.

 Lyrics 
There was confusion and debate over the line "Are we human, or are we dancer?" in the song's chorus due to its grammar. Debate raged across the internet over whether the lyric said "dancer", "dancers" or "denser", a misunderstanding which elicited conflicting interpretations of the song's meaning.Spence, Darren (January 16, 2009), "Chart Choice". Retrieved January 27, 2009. On the band's official website, the biography section states that Flowers is singing "Are we human, or are we dancer?" and also says that the lyric was inspired by a disparaging comment made by Hunter S. Thompson, who stated that America was "raising a generation of dancers, afraid to take one step out of line". From an interview:

In 2014, it was voted the "weirdest lyric of all time" by a Blinkbox survey.

 Chart performance 
In the US "Human" debuted at number 13 on Billboards Hot Modern Rock Tracks chart, and peaked at number 6. It is the band's sixth top-10 hit on the chart. The song debuted and peaked at number 32 on the Billboard Hot 100 on the chart week of October 18, 2008, giving the Killers their third top-40 hit there. It reached number 3 on the UK Singles Chart, and in 2012, BBC Radio 1 announced that it was the 39th-most-downloaded song of all time in the country.

On the Canadian Hot 100, the song debuted at number nine. It debuted at number 34 on the New Zealand RIANZ chart, and entered at number four on the Norway Top 20, then reached number one. "Human" reached the top ten on the Irish Singles Chart and in Sweden."The Killers - Human (Song) The song debuted at number 48 on the Australian Aria Charts and peaked at number 28.

 Music video 

The music video for "Human" was released in mid-October 2008 and directed by Danny Drysdale. It features the band performing the song in Goblin Valley State Park, Utah. The portraits of the band drawn for the album by Paul Normansell are shown in the video, such as when the band members hold the portraits in front of their faces. Various animals are also shown throughout the video, such as a white tiger, an eagle, and a cougar. It's been noted to have heavy similarities to Pink Floyd's Live at Pompeii concert film, such as the band playing the song in a desert landscape amongst various amplifiers and other stage equipment and mostly in much of the camera angles. The video ends with the band watching the sun setting in the desert, which turns into the album cover, also drawn by Paul Normansell.

 In popular culture 

 Media 
The song was used for the Spanish television station Telecinco for the ad of the 2010 FIFA World Cup Final. The motto was "Una final no se juega; una final se gana" (A final is not played; a final is won).

On November 25, 2008, the song was available as downloadable content for the game Guitar Hero World Tour.

In 2018, the song was used by American Express on one of its TV advertisements.

 Versions 
 DJs Armin van Buuren and Ferry Corsten produced remixes.
 English duo Go West covered the song in November 2015 on the compilation album 80's Re:Covered. The same album also included a remix.
 Actress Minnie Driver released a cover on her third studio album Ask Me to Dance (2014).
 For her Spotify Singles EP (2018), Kim Petras performed an acoustic cover of the song recorded at Spotify Studios NYC.
 The indie rock duo Better Oblivion Community Center performed a version of "Human" during its 2019 tour.

 Awards 

 Track listings 7-inch vinyl single "Human" – 4:09
 "A Crippling Blow" – 3:37European cardsleeve single "Human" – 4:09
 "A Crippling Blow" – 3:37German CD "Human" – 4:09
 "A Crippling Blow" – 3:37
 "Human" (Armin van Buuren Club Remix) – 8:11
 "Human" (Video Clip) – Enhanced CDDigital remixes EP "Human" (Armin van Buuren Radio Remix) – 3:47
 "Human" (Ferry Corsten Radio Remix) – 4:26
 "Human" (Pink Noise Radio Edit) – 4:06
 "Human" (Armin Van Buuren Club Remix) – 8:11
 "Human" (Ferry Corsten Club Remix) – 6:53Limited-edition 12-inch vinyl single'''
 "Human" – 4:09
 "A Crippling Blow" – 3:37

Charts

Weekly charts

Year-end charts

Decade-end charts

Certifications

References 

 (has music video, needs Flash)

The Killers songs
2008 singles
2008 songs
Island Records singles
Kim Petras songs
New wave ballads
Number-one singles in Israel
Number-one singles in Norway
Song recordings produced by Stuart Price
Songs about dancing
Songs written by Brandon Flowers
Songs written by Dave Keuning
Songs written by Mark Stoermer
Songs written by Ronnie Vannucci Jr.
Synth-pop ballads